The Cantho Catfish are a Vietnamese professional basketball team based in Cần Thơ, Vietnam. They play in the Vietnam Basketball Association.

Season-by-season record

Roster

References

Basketball teams established in 2016
Basketball teams in Vietnam
Vietnam Basketball Association teams